José Manuel Uría González (born 1 December 1969) is a Spanish former cyclist.

Major results
1994
 1st Subida al Naranco
1995
 3rd Subida al Naranco
1997
 1st Overall Vuelta a los Valles Mineros
1st Stage 1
 2nd Clásica a los Puertos de Guadarrama
 10th Overall Escalada a Montjuich

Grand Tour general classification results timeline

References

1969 births
Living people
Spanish male cyclists
Sportspeople from Gijón
Cyclists from Asturias